The Diamond Exchange District (Hebrew: מִתְחַם הַבּוּרְסָה, Mitham HaBursa, lit. "The Exchange District") is a diamond district and commercial area in the Tel Aviv District city of Ramat Gan, Israel. the district is the hub of Israel's diamond industry as well as a major commercial center. As of 2019, the district contains 1.1 million square meters of commercial and living space, and is responsible for 60% of Ramat Gan's municipal revenue.

The Israel Diamond Exchange, the centerpiece of the district, contains four buildings connected by bridges; the Maccabi Tower, Shimshon Tower, Noam Tower, and Diamond Tower. Diamond Tower contains the world's largest diamond trading floor and is the head-building of the exchange. Also in the district are a number of other buildings of importance. Moshe Aviv Tower is Israel's second tallest building at 235 meters. Sheraton City Tower is a hotel in the district, whilst other notable buildings are the Ayalon Tower and Gibor Sport House. Tel Aviv's Central railway station is connected to the district by a pedestrian bridge.

The Harry Oppenheimer Diamond Museum displays models of world-famous diamonds, including the Koh-i-Noor Diamond currently set in the crown of the Queen of the United Kingdom, the diamond given to Elizabeth Taylor by Richard Burton on her 40th birthday, and items such as an hourglass with "sand" made of diamonds, a diamond-set tennis ball and Biblically inspired brooches incorporating diamonds.

Buildings

Moshe Aviv Tower

The Moshe Aviv Tower, also known as City Gate, was the tallest building in Israel.

Leonardo City Tower

Leonardo City Tower is the tallest hotel in Israel. It was the tallest building in Ramat Gan from its construction in 2000, until 2001, when it was surpassed by the Moshe Aviv Tower.

Diamond Tower

The Diamond Tower containing the world's largest diamond trading hall, accommodating up to 1,000 people. At 115 meters over 32 floors, the tower was the tallest building in Ramat Gan from 1989 until 2000, when it was surpassed by the Sheraton City Tower.

Ayalon Tower
The Ayalon Tower has 35 floors, used for office purposes, and is 132 meters in height, excluding its decorative spire, making it the third tallest building in Ramat Gan. An average floor in the tower covers 1,000 square meters, the tower's parking lot is 20,000 square meters.

The tower was completed on May 10, 2009, after the construction was stopped in 2002 with only 17 floors due to lack of demand for office areas. On the top of the tower a helipad was built, and temporarily removed after 4 years in 2006 when the rest of the tower's floors were built.

Among other corporations, the headquarters of Bank Otsar Ha-Hayal are located in the Ayalon Tower.

Gibor Sport House
The Gibor Sport House is 114 meters in height, has 29 floors and was completed in April 2000. The building was designed by AMAV Architects, the architects of the Moshe Aviv Tower. As such, it has many similarities in terms of its design, with many likening it to a scaled down version due to its similar shape and materials. The tower's car park connects to the parking areas of both its neighbours; Sheraton City Tower to the south and the Ayalon Tower to the north.

In 2014, the addition of 8 new floors was approved. Construction began in 2016 and finished in 2018. During the construction, the building got renovated.

HaKikar Tower 

HaKikar Tower was home to financial company, Banc De Binary until 2017, and it was named BDB Tower. The building was designed by Gwircman E. Architects Ltd. and completed in 1988. It is situated on 38 Tuval Street, Ramat Gan. Its unusual modernism architectural design and use of concrete materials makes it one of the more noticeable buildings in the Exchange District. It has 10 floors and covers 3,000 square meters.

Administration
Since 2015, the district has been administered by the Diamond Exchange District Administration. As of 2019, its annual budget was ILS 5 million. The administration is responsible for the physical upkeep of the public space, as well as marketing and general development.

Future
As of 2019, the city of Ramat Gan is promoting a plan, drafted by architect David Galor, to increase the Diamond Exchange District's occupied space from 1.1 million square meters to 3.7 million. The plan includes a 120-floor tower, an addition of 1,000 apartments and a general urban renewal scheme for the district.

See also
Diamond District, New York City
Antwerp diamond district, Belgium
Silicon Wadi
Economy of Israel
Moshe Schnitzer, key player in the international diamond trade, 1967–1993 President of the Israel Diamond Exchange
Twin Towers (Ramat Gan)

References

External links

Diamond Exchange District

Diamond industry in Israel
Jewellery districts
Ramat Gan
Tel Aviv District